Beyond the Stars is a 1989 American drama film written and directed by David Saperstein and starred Martin Sheen, Christian Slater, Sharon Stone, Olivia d'Abo, and F. Murray Abraham.

Plot
This science fiction drama centers on Eric, teenage son of a computer scientist who worked for the Apollo program which sent the first humans to the Moon. Eric, determined to become an astronaut himself one day, befriends Paul Andrews, the thirteenth man on the Moon. Paul is avoided by other astronauts nowadays because he was very rude and rebuffing when he returned from space. Eric slowly learns that Paul discovered something during his excursion on the Moon that he keeps as a secret.

Production
The movie was filmed in and around Huntsville, Alabama and the U.S. Space & Rocket Center, and outside of Vancouver, British Columbia, Canada.

Cast 
 Christian Slater as Eric Michaels 
 Martin Sheen as Paul Andrews  
 Robert Foxworth as Richard Michaels 
 Sharon Stone as Laurie McCall 
 Olivia d'Abo as Mara Simons 
 F. Murray Abraham as Dr. Harry Bertram 
Don S. Davis as Phil Clawson 
William S. Taylor as Dr. Willis
Babz Chula as Anne Michaels
Terence Kelly as Al Fletcher

External links
 
 

1989 drama films
1989 films
American drama films
Films about astronauts
Films shot at the U.S. Space & Rocket Center
Films shot in Vancouver
1980s English-language films
1980s American films